Amelup is a small town in the Great Southern region of Western Australia located on Chester Pass Road,  north-northeast of Albany. At the 2021 census Amelup recorded a population of 71.
The Amelup service station is located 9 km north of the Stirling Range National Park situated between the Stirling Range and Borden.

The area was once a centre of the sandalwood trade, with cutters working the area in the 1890s. Sandalwood Road is a reminder of the town's past. The town is mostly known for its "CAUTION NUDISTS CROSSING" sign on the main street.

The area was opened for selection in 1928 with over 400 acres being allocated. Most land is now used for cereal cropping and sheep grazing for both wool and meat production.

References

External links

Great Southern (Western Australia)